Unrestricted submarine warfare is a type of naval warfare in which submarines sink merchant ships such as freighters and tankers without warning, as opposed to attacks per prize rules (also known as "cruiser rules") that call for warships to search merchantmen and place crews in "a place of safety" (for which lifeboats do not qualify, except under particular circumstances) before sinking them, unless the ship shows "persistent refusal to stop ... or active resistance to visit or search". To follow the rules a submarine must surface, defeating the purpose of submarines and putting itself in danger of attack.

History 
Limitations on warfare at sea date back to the 1899 Hague Convention.

During the First World War, the United Kingdom introduced Q-ships with concealed deck guns and many armed merchantmen, leading Germany to ignore the prize rules. In the most dramatic episode they sank  in 1915 in a few minutes because she was carrying war munitions. The U.S. demanded it stop, and Germany did so. Admiral Henning von Holtzendorff, chief of the Imperial Admiralty staff, argued successfully in early 1917 to resume the attacks and thus starve the British. The German high command realized the resumption of unrestricted submarine warfare meant war with the United States but calculated that American mobilization would be too slow to stop a German victory on the Western Front.

Following Germany's resumption of unrestricted submarine warfare on February 1, 1917, countries tried to limit or even abolish submarines. The 1909 Declaration of London required submarines to abide by prize rules. These regulations did not prohibit arming merchantmen, but having them report contact with submarines (or raiders) made them de facto naval auxiliaries and removed the protection of the prize rules. This rendered the restrictions on submarines effectively useless. While such tactics increase the combat effectiveness of the submarine and improve its chances of survival, some regard them as a breach of the rules of war, especially when employed against neutral vessels in a war zone.

After World War I, there was a strong push to construct international rules prohibiting submarine attacks on merchant ships. In 1922 the United States, the United Kingdom, Japan, France and Italy signed the Washington Treaty on Poison Gas and Submarines, to so restrict the use of submarines as to make them useless as commerce raiders. France did not ratify, so the treaty did not go into effect.

In 1936, states signed the London Protocol on Submarine Warfare. 

Interwar prohibitions on unrestricted submarine warfare have been described as being too unspecified, thus leading to disagreements over how to interpret the rules and agreements. For example, it was unclear what differentiated merchant ships from military ships, in particular given that Britain wanted to retain the rights to arm its merchants. Furthermore, it was considered impractical for small submarines to take on the crews of noncombatant ships due to a lack of space. Crews could be placed in emergency boats, but there was disagreement as to how safe that was.

Prior to World War II, 48 states had accepted the prohibitions on unrestricted submarine warfare, including the great power combatants during World War II.

Instances 
There have been four major campaigns of unrestricted submarine warfare, one in World War I and three in World War II:
The U-boat campaign of World War I, waged intermittently by Germany between 1915 and 1918 against Britain and her allies. One of the most infamous acts was on May 7, 1915 when U-boat  deliberately torpedoed the British Cunard luxury liner RMS Lusitania. Germany's resumption of unrestricted submarine warfare in February 1917, together with the Zimmermann Telegram, brought American entry into World War I on the British side.
The Battle of the Atlantic during World War II.  Between 1939 and 1945, it was waged between Nazi Germany and the Allies and also from 1940 to 1943 between Fascist Italy and the Allies.
The Baltic Sea Campaigns on the Eastern Front, during World War II.  Between 1941 and 1945, especially from 1942, it was waged between Nazi Germany and the Soviet Union, primarily in the Baltic Sea.
The Pacific War during World War II, between 1941 and 1945, waged between the Allies and the Japanese Empire.

The four cases were attempts to impose a naval blockade on countries, especially those heavily dependent on merchant shipping to supply their war industries and feed their populations (such as Britain and Japan), when their enemies were unable to institute a conventional naval blockade.

See also 
 Submarine warfare
 Defensively equipped merchant ship
 Commerce raiding
 Tonnage war
 Arabic pledge
 Sussex pledge
 Tsushima Maru
 War Order No. 154
 Laconia incident
 Laconia Order
 List by death toll of ships sunk by submarines
 Baralong incidents
 Karl Dönitz
 9 January 1917 German Crown Council meeting

References

Sources 
 
 

Submarine warfare
Military strategy
Military doctrines
U-boat Campaign (World War I)
World War II crimes
Naval warfare tactics